Bruzon is a surname. Notable people with the surname include:

Charles Bruzon (1938–2013), Gibraltarian politician
Lázaro Bruzón (born 1982), Cuban chess grandmaster
Oscar Bruzon (born 1977), Spanish footballer and manager

See also
Bruton (surname)